María Eugenia Rencoret Ríos (born 11 November 1964), nicknamed "Quena", is a Chilean director and producer of telenovelas.

Biography
Later she studied television production and direction at the Professional Institute of Sciences and Arts (INCA-CEA) in Santiago. At age 20, she began her practice of television direction in the dramatic department of Televisión Nacional de Chile (TVN), achieving a professional title.

From then on, she was in charge of all productions during the second half of the year, among which dramatic shows stood out, such as Amores de mercado, the most watched telenovela in the history of the format of fiction with an average rating of 46.7 points.

In 2005 she took over as General Director of the Dramatic Department of the public station. This series of stories brought in audiences, allowing the consolidation of a second block of television series at 11:30 pm.

In 2011 and under its mandate, TVN's Dramatic Department once again experienced growth, generating a third block of series, now at 3:30 pm. The lead show of this new format was Esperanza, in August 2011, starring Daniela Ramírez.

In January 2014, Rencoret resigned from TVN, and moved to Mega along with actors, directors, producers, and screenwriters, to develop and consolidate a new fiction department. This is how the Mega Dramatic Department was created. Since its first project, Pituca Sin Lucas, it has achieved great ratings success, allowing the private channel to consolidate three time slots with national productions. Among those that have achieved the greatest notoriety are Amanda, Sres. Papis, and Perdona nuestros pecados.

She has been married to executive  since 2010. She was formerly married to producer Luis Molina, with whom she had three children.

Positions

Select filmography

Director
 1993 – 
 1994 – 
 1995 – 
 1996 – Loca piel
 1997 – Tic Tac
 1999 – Aquelarre
 2000 – 
 2001 – Amores de mercado
 2002 – 
 2003 – 
 2004 – 
 2011 – Esperanza

Assistant director
 1986 – 
 1987 – 
 1988 – 
 1988 – 
 1989 – 
 1990 – 
 1991 –

References

External links
 

1964 births
Chilean television producers
Living people
People from Santiago
Telenovela producers
Chilean television directors
Women television directors
Women television producers